The Specialized Staff for Overseas and Foreign Affairs (EMSOME) was historically dedicated to training the French Army in interculturality and was the maison mere (mother-parent) of the Troupes de marine. It is located at the Ecole militaire in Paris and at Fréjus (the Museum of the Troupes de Marine).

From July 1, 2016, the Overseas and Foreign Specialization Military School was reorganized as the Specialized Overseas and Foreign Staff. While leading the implementation of the land policy overseas and abroad set by the Chief of Staff of the Army is a new role for EMSOME, its historical training missions and local expertise endure. 

As of July 1, 2016, the school has evolved into an Overseas Organic Chain Headquarters (OME), under the Commandement des Forces Terrestres (Land Forces Command). EMSOME was transformed but retained its acronym, flag and badge. The staff has organic responsibility for eleven units (9e RIMa, 33e RIMa, 43e BIMa, 6e BIMa, 5e RIAOM, 2e RPIMa, RIMAP-NC, RIMAP-P and 3e REI, DLEM, 5e RC) and guarantees their performance in coordination with the joint commanders and the commands and directorates of the Army. Meeting the needs of the units is also the responsibility of EMSOME. Interface between the regiments, the land forces command (CFT) and the Army staff, the field of action of the staff from 2016 covers the areas of HR and chancellery, logistics, specialized training. EMSOME also contributes to the definition of FT OME policy.

The specialized staff for overseas and foreign countries controls the OME and jungle areas within the Army. During 2018, a command for the operational military partnership of the Army (COM PMO) was created, for which a foreshadowing echelon was inaugurated in October 2017. This structure is backed by EMSOME.

Units overseas in 1989

Forces armées prépositionnées en Afrique 
 6e Bataillon d’Infanterie de Marine (6e BIMa), Libreville (Gabon)
 23e Bataillon d’Infanterie de Marine (23e BIMa), Dakar (Senegal)
 43e Bataillon d’Infanterie de Marine (43e BIMa), Port-Bouët, Abidjan (Ivory Coast, formed 1 July 1978)

Djibouti 

Army forces in Djibouti:
 Forces armées stationnées à Djibouti, Djibouti
 10e Bataillon de Commandement et de Soutien (10e BCS), Djibouti
 5e Régiment interarmes d'outre-mer, Djibouti
 13e Demi-brigade de la Légion Étrangère, Djibouti

Antilles & Guiana 
Army forces in the Lesser Antilles and French Guiana:
 Forces armées du groupe Antilles-Guyane, Fort-de-France (Martinique)
 16e Bataillon de Commandement et de Soutien (16e BCS), Fort-de-France (Martinique)
 3e Régiment Étranger d'Infanterie (3e REI), Kourou (Guiana)
 33e Régiment d’Infanterie de Marine (33 RIMa), Fort-de-France (Martinique)
 9e Bataillon d’Infanterie de Marine (9e BIMA), Cayenne (Guiana)
 41e Bataillon d’Infanterie de Marine (41e BIMa, Baie-Mahault (Guadeloupe)

 1er Régiment du service militaire adapté,	Fort-de-France (Martinique)
 2e Régiment du service militaire adapté, Pointe-à-Pitre (Guadeloupe)
 3e Régiment du service militaire adapté, Cayenne (Guiana)
 Groupement du service militaire adapté Saint-Jean-du-Maroni (Guiana)

Indian Ocean 
Army forces in the Southern Indian Ocean:
 Forces armées de la zone sud de l'Océan Indien, Saint-Denis (Réunion)
 53e Bataillon de Commandement et de Soutien (53e BCS), Saint-Denis (Réunion)
 2e Régiment Parachutiste d'Infanterie de Marine (2e RPIMa), Saint-Denis (Réunion)
 Détachement de la Légion Étrangère à Mayotte, Dzaoudzi (Mayotte)
 4e Régiment du service militaire adapté, Saint-Denis (Réunion)

French Polynesia 
Army forces in French Polynesia:
 Forces armées en Polynésie Française, Papeete (Tahiti)
 5e Régiment Étranger d'Infanterie (5e RE), Moruroa
 Régiment d'infanterie du Marine du Pacifique–Polynésie, Papeete
 815e Bataillon de Transmission (815e BT), Papeete

New Caledonia 
Army forces in New Caledonia:
 Forces armées de la Nouvelle-Calédonie, Nouméa
 42e Bataillon de Commandement et de Soutien (42e BCS), Nouméa
 Régiment d'Infanterie du Marine du Pacifique-Nouvelle-Calédonie, Nouméa 
 Groupement du service militaire adapté, Nouméa

Composition c. 2018

References

External links 
Site officiel de l'EMSOME 

Military training establishments of France
Army units and formations of France